Michael Dohner Farmhouse is a historic home located at East Lampeter Township, Lancaster County, Pennsylvania. It is a two-story, fieldstone dwelling, five bays long and two bays deep.  The original section was built about 1732, in a configuration typical of a German continental house.  It features a massive interior fireplace.

It was listed on the National Register of Historic Places in 1980.

References

Houses on the National Register of Historic Places in Pennsylvania
Houses completed in 1732
Houses in Lancaster County, Pennsylvania
National Register of Historic Places in Lancaster County, Pennsylvania